Satiender Sehmi (born 5 April 1954) is a Kenyan sports shooter. He competed in the men's 50 metre rifle prone event at the 1992 Summer Olympics.

References

1954 births
Living people
Kenyan male sport shooters
Olympic shooters of Kenya
Shooters at the 1992 Summer Olympics
Place of birth missing (living people)